Jokin Mújika Aramburu (born 22 August 1962) is a former professional road cyclist and cyclocross-racer from the Basque Country.

Career achievements

Major results

Road
 Stage 2, Vuelta a Galega 1984
 Stage 7, Tour de l'Avenir 1986
 General classification, Vuelta a Galega 1987
 General classification, Stage 3, Bicicleta Eibarresa 1988
 1st, Clásica a los Puertos 1989

Cyclo-cross
 Spanish National Cyclo-cross Championships champion, Elite, 1993
 Spanish National Cyclo-cross Championships champion, Elite, 1994
 Llodio, Cyclocross 1994
 Spanish champion, Elite, 1996

Grand Tour general classification results timeline

References
sports-reference

External links

1962 births
Living people
Cyclists from the Basque Country (autonomous community)
Cyclo-cross cyclists
Cyclists at the 1996 Summer Olympics
Olympic cyclists of Spain
People from Goierri
Spanish male cyclists
Sportspeople from Gipuzkoa